WMPL (920 AM, Wimple) is a radio station located in Hancock, Michigan which broadcasts a talk radio format during the day and a sports radio format at night. WMPL also carries broadcasts of local high school football, basketball, and hockey games.

References
Michiguide.com - WMPL History

External links

MPL
News and talk radio stations in the United States
Radio stations established in 1957